China Grove is a historic house located in Gardner, Louisiana. It was added to the National Register of Historic Places on December 5, 1984. The house is considered to be an outstanding example of neo-classical and Greek Revival architecture; its Greek Revival woodwork in particular stands out among houses in the region.

It was listed as one result of a study of 10 Neo-Classical farm-plantation houses along Bayou Rapides.  As for several of the others (Eden, Geneva, Hope, Island Home, Longview), China Grove was modified by addition of hood along its original gallery, termed a false gallery, which provides additional protection from the rain, detracting somewhat but not greatly from its original appearance.

References

Houses on the National Register of Historic Places in Louisiana
Houses completed in 1857
Houses in Rapides Parish, Louisiana
Neoclassical architecture in Louisiana
National Register of Historic Places in Rapides Parish, Louisiana
1857 establishments in Louisiana